Apes are anthropoids of the Hominoidea superfamily.

Ape or APE may also refer to:

People
 Ape, an alias of the 19th century artist Carlo Pellegrini (1839–1889)
 Keith Ape, South Korean rapper

Fictional characters
 Ape, a fictional character from the George of the Jungle franchise
 Ape (comics), a mutant character in the Marvel Comics universe

Places
 Ape, Latvia, town in Latvia
 Ape Parish, Ape Municipality, Latvia
 Ape Canyon, Plains of Abraham, Mount St. Helens, Washington, USA
 Ape Hill, Shoushan, Kaohsiung, Taiwan

Science and technology
 Ape (plant), the Polynesian name for the giant taro plant
 Xanthosoma ('ape), tropical American plant
 Acute pulmonary edema, fluid accumulation on the lungs
 Anomalous photovoltaic effect, a type of a photovoltaic effect which occurs in semiconducting materials
 AP Environmental Science, the environmental science course in the Advanced Placement program
 Available potential energy, or convective available potential energy, the energy a parcel of air would have if lifted through the atmosphere

Computing
 AJAX Push Engine, an open source Comet/push server
 ANSI/POSIX Environment, a POSIX compatibility layer for the Plan 9 operating system
 APE tag, a tag format used to add metadata to digital audio files
 .ape, a filename extension used by Monkey's Audio
 APE100, a series of Italian supercomputers
 Application Enhancer, a product by Unsanity
 AVS plugin effect, any third-party addition to the Advanced Visualization Studio computer software
 Auckland Peering Exchange, a peering point serving Auckland, New Zealand

Arts and entertainment
 Agency to Prevent Evil, a fictional agency in Lancelot Link, Secret Chimp
 Animals project editor in the computer game Zoo Tycoon
 APE Con or Alternative Press Expo, an annual comics convention
 "The Ape", a song by Level 42 on the album Guaranteed
 The Apes, a band from Washington, D.C.

Films
 The Ape (1940 film) starring Boris Karloff
 Ape (1976 film)
 The Ape (2005 film)
 The Ape (2009 film), a Swedish film
 Ape (2012 film)

Transportation
 Piaggio Ape, a small Italian tricycle pickup-truck
 Honda Ape, a Japanese minibike
 APE 4.80, a passenger trailer for the road

Other uses
 Adapted physical education, for learners with a disability
 Annual premium equivalent, a measure used for comparison of life insurance revenue
 APE Foundation (Association for the Protection of the Environment)
 APE, a stock market ticker for AMC Theatres, an American movie theater chain
 Ape, Inc., a video game development company
 Bukiyip language of Papua New Guinea (ISO 639 code: ape)

See also

 Ile Ape, Lembata, Indonesia
 
 
 Apeman (disambiguation)
 Great apes (disambiguation)